Moursund is an unincorporated community in Victoria County, Texas, United States.

History

On early maps of Victoria County, Moursund appears as Craig, Texas.

Moursund is entered in the USGS Geographic Names Information System (GNIS) as a "Populated Place" in Victoria County.

Geography

Moursund is situated North on U.S. Highway 87 approximately 8.5 miles North of downtown Victoria, or approximately 2.5 miles south of Nursery, Texas.

Moursund is located at  (28.8863749, -97.0577653).

External links

 U.S. Geological Survey Geographic Names Information System: Moursund, Texas (https://geonames.usgs.gov/apex/f?p=138:3:0::NO:3:P3_FID,P3_TITLE:1380223,Moursund)
 Texas Home Town Locator: Moursund, Texas (http://texas.hometownlocator.com/tx/victoria/moursund.cfm)
 Roadside Thoughts: Moursund (Victoria County, Texas) (http://roadsidethoughts.com/tx/moursund-xx-victoria-profile.htm)

Unincorporated communities in Victoria County, Texas
Unincorporated communities in Texas
Victoria, Texas metropolitan area